The name Mamie was used for 10 tropical cyclones in the northwestern Pacific Ocean:

 Typhoon Mamie (1953)
 Typhoon Mamie (1957)
 Typhoon Mamie (1960)
 Typhoon Mamie (1963)
 Typhoon Mamie (1968)
 Tropical Storm Mamie (1972)
 Tropical Storm Mamie (1975)
 Severe Tropical Storm Mamie (1982)
 Typhoon Mamie (1985)
 Tropical Storm Mamie (1988)

Mamie